Surendranath Centenary School is an English-medium school in Ranchi, India established in 1988.

History
The school is affiliated to the Central Board of Secondary Education. Its name commemorates Surendranath Banerjee, a leader of India's independence movement and co-founder of the National Council of Education in Calcutta.

The school was established in 1988 to commemorate the centenary of the establishment of first school of the Surendranath Group, by Sarsi Bala Debi Trust and token assistance from Surendranath Group.

The school started its academic session in 1988, and it was upgraded to Senior Secondary level in 1997.

Currently,  the school has two buildings - the Ranadeb Chaudhuri Block is used for primary education from Upper Kindergarten (UKG) to year V. The senior wing for years VI to XII is on four floors and includes science laboratories and computer labs.

Students are assigned to one of four houses.

See also
Education in India
Literacy in India
List of schools in India

References

External links

Primary schools in India
High schools and secondary schools in Jharkhand
Private schools in Jharkhand
Schools in Ranchi
Schools affiliated to CBSE
Educational institutions established in 1988
1988 establishments in Bihar